29 Cygni is a single star in the northern constellation of Cygnus. It is dimly visible to the naked eye as a white-hued star with an apparent visual magnitude of 4.93. The star is moving closer to the Earth with a heliocentric radial velocity of −17 km/s. It is a member of the 30–50 million year old Argus Association of co-moving stars.

This is an A-type main-sequence star with a stellar classification of A2 V. Rodríguez et al. (2000) classify it as a Delta Scuti variable with a frequency of 0.0267 cycles per day. It is a Lambda Boötis class chemically peculiar star and the first such star to be classified as a pulsating variable. 29 Cyg is multi-periodic, small-amplitude variable with a magnitude change of about 0.02 and a dominant period of 39 minutes. The star has a moderate rate of rotation, showing a projected rotational velocity of 65 km/s. It has double the mass of the Sun and is radiating 25 times the Sun's luminosity from its photosphere at an effective temperature of roughly 8,790 K.

29 Cygni is listed in multiple star catalogs as having several companions within , including the yellow 7th magnitude HD 192661.  All are background objects not physically associated with 29 Cygni itself.  The naked-eye stars b1 Cygni and b2 Cygni, respectively about one and two degrees away, also lie at different distances to 29 Cygni.

Planetary system
In 2022, a superjovian extrasolar planet HIP 99770 b was discovered by direct imaging and astrometry. Its spectral class is between L7 and L9.5, corresponding to a surface temperature of 1400 K.

References

A-type main-sequence stars
Delta Scuti variables
Lambda Boötis stars
Cygnus (constellation)
BD+36 3955
J20143203+3648225
Cygni, 29
192640
099770
7736
Cygni, V1644
Planetary systems with one confirmed planet